Eileen Lyons (born July 3, 1941) was a Republican member of the Illinois House of Representatives from 1995 until 2006.

Biography
Born in New York City, New York, Lyons received her bachelor's degree in English from Elmhurst College. She lived in Western Springs, Illinois.

In the 1994 general election, Lyons defeated two-term incumbent David McAfee in the Republican-leaning 47th district. Two years later, Lyons defended her seat successfully against a targeted effort by the Illinois Democratic Party on behalf of Mark Pera

During the 93rd General Assembly, she was an Assistant Minority Leader under Tom Cross.

Lyons opted not to run for reelection in the 2006 election. Jim Durkin, who served in the Illinois House from 1995 to 2003, chose to enter the race to succeed her. Lyons opted to resign from the Illinois House of Representatives midway through the 94th General Assembly effective January 5, 2006. Local Republicans leaders appointed Durkin to the vacancy. During the 2008 Republican Party presidential primaries, Lyons endorsed the presidential campaign of Rudy Giuliani.

Notes

1941 births
Living people
Politicians from New York City
People from Western Springs, Illinois
Elmhurst College alumni
Women state legislators in Illinois
Republican Party members of the Illinois House of Representatives
21st-century American women